Milkovo is a rural locality (a selo) and the administrative center of Milkovsky District, Kamchatka Krai, Russia. Population: 

Milkovo was first mentioned in 1743. An ironworks was founded in Milkovo in 1752, but closed after 20 years. A road connecting Milkovo with Petropavlovsk-Kamchatsky was opened in 1966.

References

Notes

Sources

Rural localities in Kamchatka Krai